Matthew Atkins (born December 13, 1990) is an American professional golfer.

Atkins was born in Aston, Pennsylvania. He played college golf at Henderson State University for one year before transferring to the University of South Carolina Aiken. He won three events for the Pacers. He turned professional after graduating in 2013.

Atkins played on mini-tours until he qualified for the 2015 Web.com Tour via Q-school. He played on the Web.com Tour from 2015 to 2017. He won the 2017 El Bosque Mexico Championship and finished 19th on the money list to earn a PGA Tour card for 2018.

On the PGA Tour in 2018, Atkins best finish was a tie for 22nd at the Corales Puntacana Resort and Club Championship. After finishing 211th in the FedEx Cup standings, he dropped to the Web.com Tour for 2019.

Amateur wins
2012 NCAA Division II South/SE Regional
2013 Palmetto Invitational, Peach Belt Conference Championship

Source:

Professional wins (1)

Web.com Tour wins (1)

See also
2017 Web.com Tour Finals graduates

References

External links
 
 

American male golfers
PGA Tour golfers
Korn Ferry Tour graduates
Golfers from Pennsylvania
Golfers from South Carolina
USC Aiken Pacers athletes
Sportspeople from Delaware County, Pennsylvania
People from North Augusta, South Carolina
1990 births
Living people